Jay Hughes may refer to:

 Jay Hughes (1874–1924), American baseball pitcher
 Jay Hughes (politician) (born 1963), American Democratic politician
 Jay Hughes (American football) (born 1991), American college football player